Stade de ASC HLM is a multi-use stadium in Dakar, Senegal.  It is currently used mostly for football matches and serves as a home ground of ASC HLM. The stadium holds 5,000 people.

ASC HLM
Sport in Dakar